Columbo is an American crime drama television series starring Peter Falk as Lieutenant Columbo, a homicide detective with the Los Angeles Police Department. Season 2 aired on NBC from September 1972 to March 1973.

Broadcast history

The season originally aired Sundays at 8:30-10:00 pm (EST) as part of The NBC Sunday Mystery Movie.

DVD release
The season was released on DVD by Universal Studios Home Entertainment.

Episodes

Columbo 02
1972 American television seasons
1973 American television seasons